The 38th (1st Staffordshire) Regiment of Foot was an infantry regiment of the British Army, raised in 1705. Under the Childers Reforms it amalgamated with the 80th Regiment of Foot (Staffordshire Volunteers) to form the South Staffordshire Regiment in 1881.

History

Early years

The regiment was first raised by Colonel Sir John Guise as Sir John Guise's Regiment of Foot in 1688 and then disbanded in England in 1694. It was raised a second time by General Luke Lillingston as Luke Lillingstone's Regiment of Foot with personnel from the previous regiment in 1694 and then disbanded in the West Indies in 1696.

The regiment was raised a third time at Lichfield by General Luke Lillingston as Luke Lillingstone's Regiment of Foot  in March 1705. It was ranked as the 38th regiment in 1747. It was posted to Ireland later in the year and then sent to the West Indies in 1707. On 1 July 1751 a royal warrant was issued which provided that in future regiments would no longer be known by their colonel's name, but would bear a regimental number based on their precedence: the regiment became the 38th Regiment of Foot. It returned to Ireland in 1764 and then went to Boston in Massachusetts in 1774. It fought at the Battle of Bunker Hill in June 1775 and at the Battle of Brandywine in September 1777 during the American Revolutionary War. The regiment took a county title as the 38th (1st Staffordshire) Regiment of Foot in 1782 and returned to Ireland in 1790.

Napoleonic wars
Following the outbreak of war with France, the flank companies of the regiment sailed for the West Indies and in March 1794 took part in the capture of Martinique.  Meanwhile, the battalion companies of the 38th served in the Low Countries with the Duke of York. In 1796 the regiment was reunited in the West Indies and in May 1796 took part in the capture of Saint Lucia and the capture of Trinidad in 1797. After taking part in the capture of the Cape of Good Hope in January 1806, it embarked for South America where it fought under General William Beresford at the capture of Montevideo in January 1807 and at the attack on Buenos Aires in July 1807 during the British invasions of the River Plate.

The 1st battalion embarked for the Peninsular in June 1808 and saw action at the Battle of Roliça in August 1808, the Battle of Vimeiro later in August 1808, and the retreat to Corunna under Lieutenant-General Sir John Moore in June 1809. The 1st battalion also took part in the disastrous Walcheren Campaign in autumn 1809. The 1st battalion returned to the Peninsular in spring 1812 and took part in the Battle of Salamanca in July 1812, the siege of Burgos in September 1812, and the Battle of Vitoria in June 1813 as well as the siege of San Sebastián in September 1813. It then pursued the French Army into France and fought at the Battle of Nivelle in November 1813, at the Battle of the Nive in December 1813 and at the Battle of Orthez in February 1814 as well as at the Battle of Toulouse in April 1814 and at the Battle of Bayonne later in April 1814. Meanwhile, the 2nd battalion took part in the Battle of Bussaco in September 1810 and the siege of Badajoz in March 1812.

The Victorian era
The regiment was sent to the Cape of Good Hope for service in the Fifth Xhosa War in 1818 and then to India in 1822 from where it was deployed to Burma for service in the First Anglo-Burmese War in 1824. It returned to England in May 1836 and proceeded to Ireland in May 1837 before embarking for Zante in the Ionian Sea in September 1840. It went on to Gibraltar in March 1843 and to Jamaica in November 1845 before proceeding to Halifax, Nova Scotia in April 1848. After returning to England in August 1851, it was dispatched to the Crimea for service in the Crimean War in April 1854. It took part in the Battle of the Alma in September 1854, Battle of Inkerman in November 1854 and the siege of Sevastopol in winter 1854. The regiment then embarked for India in August 1857 and saw action at the Capture of Lucknow in March 1858 during Indian Rebellion. It also took part in the expedition against the Black Mountain tribes in 1868 before returning to England in 1871.

As part of the Cardwell Reforms of the 1870s, where single-battalion regiments were linked together to share a single depot and recruiting district in the United Kingdom, the 38th was linked with the 80th Regiment of Foot (Staffordshire Volunteers), and assigned to district no. 19 at Whittington Barracks in Lichfield. On 1 July 1881 the Childers Reforms came into effect and the regiment amalgamated with the 80th Regiment of Foot (Staffordshire Volunteers) to form the South Staffordshire Regiment.

Battle honours
The battle honours of the regiment were as follows:
 South America: Monte Video  
 Peninsular War: Roliça, Vimiera, Corunna, Busaco, Badajoz, Salamanca, Vitoria, San Sebastián, Nive, Peninsula
 First Anglo-Burmese War: Ava
 Crimean War: Alma, Inkerman, Sevastopol
 Indian Mutiny: Lucknow 
 West Indies: Guadeloupe 1759, Martinique 1762 (awarded 1909 to successor regiment)

Regimental colonels
The colonels of the regiment were as follows:
First raising 		
1688–1689: Sir John Guise
1689–1693: Jonathan Foulkes
1693-1694: Brig-Gen. Luke Lillingston
 disbanded 1694

Second raising
1694–1696: Brig-Gen. Luke Lillingston
 disbanded 1696

Third raising
1702–1705: vacant?
1705–1708: Brig-Gen. Luke Lillingston
1708–1711: Col. James Jones
1711–1717: Col. Francis Alexander
1717–1729: Col. Richard Lucas
1729–1735: Brig-Gen. Edward Jones
1735–1738: Brig-Gen. Hon. Robert Murray
1738–1739: Gen. Charles Spencer, 3rd Duke of Marlborough, KG
1739–1750: Lt-Gen. Robert Dalzell
1750–October 1750: Lt-Gen. Richard Philipps

38th Regiment of Foot
1751–1756: Lt-Gen. Alexander Duroure
1756–1760: Maj-Gen. Sir James Ross, Bt.
1760–1761: Maj-Gen. David Watson
1761–1762: Maj-Gen. Andrew Robinson
1762–1766: Maj-Gen. Hon. Sharrington Talbot
1766–1775: Lt-Gen. Cadwallader Blayney, 9th Baron Blayney
1775–1796: Gen. Sir Robert Pigot, Bt.

38th (the 1st Staffordshire) Regiment of Foot - (1782)
1796–1805: Gen. James Rooke
1805–1836: Gen. George James Ludlow, 3rd Earl Ludlow, GCB
1836–1836: Maj-Gen. Hon. Sir Charles James Greville, KCB
1836–1840: Gen. Sir Henry Pigot, GCMG
1840–1843: Lt-Gen. Sir Jasper Nicolls, KCB
1843–1862: Gen. Hon. Sir Hugh Arbuthnot, KCB
1862–1876: Gen. Sir William Mansfield, 1st Baron Sandhurst, GCB, GCSI
1876–1881: Gen. James Pattoun Sparks, CB

References

Sources

Further reading

South Staffordshire Regiment
Infantry regiments of the British Army
Military units and formations established in 1705
Military units and formations in Staffordshire
Regiments of the British Army in the Crimean War
Regiments of the British Army in the American Revolutionary War
Military units and formations disestablished in 1881
1705 establishments in England